Ivelin Ivanov Popov (born 26 October 1987) is a Bulgarian professional footballer who plays as an attacking midfielder for Levski Sofia.

Club career

Youth career

Born in Sofia, Popov started to play football in Septemvri Sofia's academy. Then he played for the youth formations of Levski Sofia from 1999 to 2004. In 2005, he trained for four months with Feyenoord but did not sign with the team because he was not 18 years old. After that, he returned to Bulgaria and played in a tournament for Beroe's youth team and there he was spotted by the Litex Lovech scouts. On 14 July 2005, he even scored a goal for Beroe in a friendly game.

Litex Lovech
Popov signed his first professional contract with Litex Lovech in December 2005. He made his European debut in the first leg of Round of 32 Stage in a 0–0 draw against Strasbourg; he made his official debut in the Bulgarian top division in a match against CSKA Sofia on 12 March 2006. He played 59 minutes. The result of the match was a 1–1 draw. On 9 April 2006, he scored his first goal in professional football against Lokomotiv Sofia. The result of the match was a 3–1 win for Litex. The same season, Popov played in 11 matches and scored five goals. In two consecutive seasons, Popov was third placed in the voting for Young player of the year award in 2005–06 and 2006–07 seasons. In the 2007–08 UEFA Cup, Popov scored a brace, in a first leg of second round, in a 3–0 win over Besa Kavajë. Eventually, Litex Lovech advanced to the next round, losing to Hamburger SV in two's leg.

On 18 September 2008, Popov scored a goal in the first round of the UEFA Cup against Aston Villa. In July 2009, Popov was given the captain's armband. At the end of the season, Popov was awarded A League's player of the season after having the most votes in the poll.

In August 2010, he went on trial to Premier League club Blackburn Rovers. He impressed the club, whereafter he received a contract offer, but the move collapsed over his work permit rejected by the British Government, having not played enough international matches.

Gaziantepspor

Kuban Krasnodar
On 25 August 2012, Popov joined Russian Premier League club Kuban Krasnodar on a three-year contract for an undisclosed fee. According to Chempionat.com, the fee was worth €2 million. He made his debut for the club, coming on as a substitute for Marcos Pizzelli, in a 2–1 win over Dynamo Moscow on 2 September 2012. On 26 October 2012, Popov scored his first goal for the club in a 1–0 win over Rostov. Less than a month later he scored his first brace, putting two goals past Krylia Sovetov and contributing with an assist in a 4–1 home victory. On 13 April 2013, Popov scored a late equalizer in a 2–2 draw away from home to Terek Grozny. On 4 May, he scored a brace as Kuban beat Rostov 2–0 away from home on.  On the last day of the 2012–13 season, Popov scored the only goal in a vital 1–0 home victory over Anzhi Makhachkala, securing Kuban a European debut in the Third Qualifying Round of the 2013–14 UEFA Europa League and earning them their best ever finish in the top flight at fifth, having the same points as fourth-placed Spartak Moscow. He finished the season with 9 goals as the club's top goalscorer together with Aras Özbiliz.

Because of his outstanding performance in the 2012–13 season, Popov was appointed captain of Kuban Krasnodar for the 2013–14 season. He captained his team to its first away victory of the season over Russian Premier League newcomer, Tom Tomsk, by contributing with a pair of assists. The match ended with a 2–1 score. His first brace came shortly after, in a historical first ever match in a European championship for Kuban. He netted two goals in a 2–0 away victory over Scottish Premier League runners-up Motherwell in the first leg of a qualifying match for the UEFA Europa League. Both goals were assisted by teammate Ibrahima Baldé. This resulted in his jersey being displayed in the National football museum.

On 28 April 2014, Ivelin Popov scored an away brace against strong Spartak Moscow in a 2–0 victory. This outstanding performance got him voted as player of week 27 in the Russian Premier League. He continued his good run the week after, which saw him providing two assists, marking a 4–0 victory over Krylia Sovetov. The first assist was turned into a goal, scored by fellow Bulgarian teammate Stanislav Manolev, marking his first goal for the club after recently being transferred from PSV Eindhoven. Popov was named man of the match for the second time in a row, earning him a spot in Russian premier league team of the week. He finished his season in Russia having provided 12 assists; making him the joint top assists provider of the season, alongside Danny from Zenit St. Petersburg. He was also included in the team of the season 2013–14, because of his consistency throughout the whole campaign.

Spartak Moscow

On 3 June 2015, it was announced that Popov had signed a long-term contract with Spartak Moscow. It was reported that the signing fee cost the club about €7 million. Popov made his league debut for Spartak as a starter in a 2–2 home draw to Ufa on 17 July. He scored his first two official goals for the club on 23 September, in a 7–0 win away to Volga Nizhny Novgorod in the Round of 32 in the Russian Cup. He followed that with his first league goal for the club, coming against Zenit as Spartak drew 2–2 at home. The goal featured a spectacular lob over Zenit defender Javi García, followed by another lob over the goalkeeper Yuri Lodigin. Popov's performance earned him the Best Player award for the tenth round of the 2015–16 Russian Premier League, as well as the most valuable player award for the month of September. He scored for the third consecutive game on 3 October, netting the only goal in a 1–0 win away to Mordovia Saransk.

On 30 April 2017, he provided two assists in a 2–1 away victory over city rivals, CSKA Moscow, which earned him a spot in the Russian Premier League team of the week for matchday 26.

On 8 January 2019, he was released from his Spartak contract by mutual consent.

Rubin Kazan
On 12 January 2018, he joined FC Rubin Kazan on loan until the end of the 2017–18 season. He scored on his debut for the club, in a 1–1 away draw against Anzhi on 2 March 2018. On 7 April 2018, he scored a brace in a 3–2 home win against Akhmat, which saw him being named Man of the Match for the second match in a row.

Rostov
On 24 January 2019, he signed a 2.5-year contract with Russian club FC Rostov.

Sochi
On 23 August 2020, he moved to another Russian club PFC Sochi in exchange for Dmitry Poloz moving the other way.

Levski Sofia
On 28 April 2022, Popov signed a two-year contract with Levski Sofia beginning from the 2022–23 season, thus returning to his home country after 12 years.

International career

In August 2007, Dimitar Penev called-up Popov in the Bulgaria national team for the friendly match with Wales. On 11 February 2009, he scored his first goal for Bulgaria against Switzerland. On 2 April 2009, Popov scored the first of two goals for Bulgaria in the 2–0 win against Cyprus. On 17 September 2010, during a friendly match against Serbia, he became the youngest player to captain the national side.
On 9 February 2011, Popov scored twice from the penalty spot in a 2–2 friendly draw with Estonia, but the result was subsequently declared void by FIFA and expunged from the records due to suspicions of match fixing with the involvement of the game officials. He captained the national team during the 2014 FIFA World Cup qualification, providing his team with two goals, including a 25-yard free kick goal against Armenia, throughout a tough campaign, having to face strong national teams like those of Italy, the Czech Republic and Denmark.

In 2015, Popov was a crucial figure in the 2–2 home draw versus Italy. He hit the back of the net to tie the score at 1–1 in the 11th minute, raising the spirits of his compatriots after a disappointing own-goal in the 4th minute. This resulted in a series of swift attacks from the home team which saw them grab the lead in the 17th minute. They were able to keep their lead until the 84th minute, but in the end had to settle for a 2–2 draw after a late equalizer. In the next official match, he once again proved his worth after the only goal in a tough but decisive 0–1 away win against Malta, keeping the hopes alive of his national team qualifying for Euro 2016.

On 31 August 2017, Ivelin Popov provided two decisive assists in a 3–2 home win against Sweden. He announced his retirement from international football in November 2019.

Controversies
Popov's name became associated with scandal early in his career and became synonymous with irresponsibility and lack of discipline. In April 2007, he was removed from Litex's starting roster due to bad form.

In September 2008, Popov was banned from the youth national team following an incident on the team bus, where he threw a bottle at the bus driver–-hitting him on the head–-who then lost control, narrowly avoiding a crash.

In September 2010, just days before the Euro 2012 qualifier against England, Popov led a group of teammates out of the training camp in Pravets and took them to Botevgrad so they could celebrate Valeri Bojinov's birthday, where the players consumed large amounts of alcohol. Days later, Bulgaria lost to England 4–0. In September 2011, as Bulgaria was preparing to host England for the second leg of the Euro 2012 qualifier, Popov again led a group of players to a bar, where they drank until 4 am, angering then coach Lothar Matthäus. Bulgaria lost to England 3–0 at home.

On 16 November 2014, Popov missed a penalty against Malta in a Euro 2016 qualifier, allowing for the match to end in a 1–1 draw. Following the game, Popov was accused of missing the penalty on purpose. Days later, it came to light that Popov had abused and humiliated the national team masseuse on several occasions, forcing him to do pushups in front of the other players. At this point, the executive committee of the Bulgarian Football Union had seen enough and proceeded to ban Popov from the national team for life.

In 2015, newly appointed head coach Ivaylo Petev reinstated Popov to the squad. The captain's band, however, went to midfielder Svetoslav Dyakov.

Career statistics

Club

International

Scores and results list Bulgaria's goal tally first, score column indicates score after each Popov goal.

Honours 
Litex Lovech
 Bulgarian A PFG: 2009–10
 Bulgarian Cup: 2007–08, 2008–09
 Bulgarian Supercup: 2010

Spartak Moscow
 Russian Premier League: 2016–17
 Russian Super Cup: 2017

Individual
 Bulgarian Players' Player of the Year: 2009–10
 Bulgarian Footballer of the Year: 2015, 2016, 2017
 List of 33 top players of the Russian league: 2013–14
 Russian Premier League Player of the Month: September 2015

References

External links

1987 births
Living people
Bulgarian footballers
Bulgaria international footballers
Bulgaria under-21 international footballers
First Professional Football League (Bulgaria) players
Süper Lig players
Russian Premier League players
PFC Litex Lovech players
Gaziantepspor footballers
FC Kuban Krasnodar players
FC Spartak Moscow players
FC Rubin Kazan players
FC Rostov players
PFC Sochi players
PFC Levski Sofia players
Bulgarian expatriate footballers
Expatriate footballers in Turkey
Expatriate footballers in Russia
Bulgarian expatriate sportspeople in Turkey
Bulgarian expatriate sportspeople in Russia
Footballers from Sofia
Association football midfielders